Tania Marie Caringi (born 1986), also known as Tania Marie, is an Italian-American model. She has appeared in magazines such as Playboy, Sports Illustrated, and Maxim. Other magazines that she has appeared in include GQ, Celeb, FHM and Esquire.

Caringi was featured in the music video for “Anywhere” by Kevin Lyttle feat. Flo Rida in 2013.

Early life
Caringi was born in Michigan and spent her childhood in the United States and Italy. She began her modeling career after being scouted by a fashion agent in Italy at the age of 19. She was a contestant in the Miss Italia USA 2010 pageant.

Career
In 2013, she was featured in the music video for “Anywhere” by Kevin Lyttle feat. Flo Rida. In October 2014, she joined the Vyzion Radio Elite Model Team.

Caringi has been featured among MODE's 100 Most Beautiful Women for three consecutive years. She was ranked #1 in 2014, #27 in 2015, and #7 in 2016. Caringi also worked with LuLu Cosmetics in 2014.

Caringi appeared in Playboy Venezuela in 2017, and was also on the cover of the June 2017 edition of Playboy Italia. She was also featured in GQ Mexico in October 2017.

She was featured as Playbabe of the Month in the January–February 2018 edition of Mancave Playbabes. In March 2018, she was featured in a pictorial for Sports Illustrated. She was also featured in both the United States and Italian 2018 editions of Maxim. Caringi also appeared on the cover of the 2020 Collector's Edition Update of MODE's 2016 100 Most Beautiful Women list. She also appeared in the March 2020 issue of Vogue Italia.

Caringi co-hosted the 2019 Miss Universe Italy beauty pageant in August 2019.

Other magazines that Caringi has appeared in include FHM, Celeb, and Esquire. She has modeled clothing for designers and companies in fashion markets such as Milan, Rome, New York, and Los Angeles.

Caringi continues to live and work in both the United States and Italy.

References

Living people
1986 births
American people of Italian descent
Female models from Michigan
21st-century American women